Royal Prussian Jagdstaffel 50, commonly abbreviated to Jasta 50, was a "hunting group" (i.e., fighter squadron) of the Luftstreitkräfte, the air arm of the Imperial German Army during World War I. The squadron would score over 45 aerial victories during the war, including 14 observation balloons downed. The unit's victories came at the expense of five killed in action, one wounded in action, and three taken prisoner of war. The squadron was disbanded on 17 January 1919.

History
Jasta 50 was founded at Flieger-Abteilung (Flier Detachment) 13, Bromberg, on 23 December 1917. It moved forward into action with 7 Armee on 11 January 1918. The squadron's initial commanding officer downed an enemy observation balloon for its first aerial victory on 25 January 1918. In September 1918, Jasta 50 was transferred to 3 Armee. On 21 October 1918, it was transferred again, to 18 Armee. The squadron was disbanded after Germany's defeat, being demobilized on 17 January 1919.

Commanding officers (Staffelführer)
 Heinrich Arntzen: 13 January 1918 — 27 May 1918
 Hans von Freden: 27 May 1918 — 17 January 1919

Duty stations
 Autremencourt, France: 11 January 1918
 Marchais, France
 Mont St Martin, France
 Rocourt-Saint-Martin, France
 Rugny Ferme
 Montbanis Ferme
 Perles, France
 Sisson
 Boncourt
 Leffincourt, France: September 1918
 Attigny, France
 Chémery
 Morville: 21 October 1918
 Saint-Gérard

Aircraft
Initially flying the Albatros D.III from January 1918, it was later upgraded with the Albatros D.V, and then re-equipped with Fokker D.VII fighters by 28 August 1918.

References

Bibliography
 

50
Military units and formations established in 1917
1917 establishments in Germany
Military units and formations disestablished in 1919
History of Bydgoszcz